Mammea immansueta is a species of flowering plant in the Calophyllaceae family. It is found only in Panama. It is threatened by habitat loss.

References

Flora of Panama
Endangered plants
immansueta
Taxonomy articles created by Polbot